Poldi Gersa (13 September 1874 in Schwechat – after 1902) was an Austrian soprano and stage actress.

Life 
She began her stage training at the age of 17. Her teachers were Anna Schröder-Schalupka in Stettin, Albert Goldberg and Louise Ottomann in Dresden.

Her first engagement was in Stettin (1891-1893), then she was in Leipzig and finally went from there to the Residenztheater in Dresden.

Both vocally and playfully she performed very creditably and is characterised by humour and a healthy, natural wit.

Roles 
 Adele in Die Fledermaus
 Fiametta in Boccaccio
 Mizi Schlager in Liebelei

References

Further reading 
 Ludwig Eisenberg: Poldi Gersa. In Großes biographisches Lexikon der deutschen Bühne im XIX. Jahrhundert. Paul List, Leipzig 1903, 320 (daten.digitale-sammlungen.de).

German stage actresses
1874 births
People from Schwechat
Year of death missing
Austro-Hungarian singers